Mimononyma flavovariegata is a species of beetle in the family Cerambycidae, and the only species in the genus Mimononyma. It was described by Breuning in 1960.

References

Apomecynini
Beetles described in 1960
Monotypic beetle genera